The Dale Bumpers College of Agricultural, Food, and Life Sciences is the University of Arkansas' college for students interested in plants, animals, food, the natural environment and the human environment. It is named for former US Senator and Arkansas governor Dale Bumpers. Bumpers College currently offers 14 majors. The Poultry Science program ranks as one of the three best nationally. Many faculty members have University of Arkansas Division of Agriculture research or extension appointments, which adds significantly to the number of teaching faculty and the resources available for instruction and extracurricular learning opportunities.

Facilities

References
 Medders, Howell. "History of Bumpers College." Condensed history of the College from the book History of the Bumpers College—Evolution of Education in the Agricultural, Food, and Life Sciences in Arkansas Retrieved on 29-3 2008.

External links
 

University of Arkansas
Educational institutions established in 1905
1905 establishments in Arkansas
Agricultural universities and colleges in the United States